MDO may refer to:
MDO (band), Puerto Rico
Marine Diesel Oil
Medium density overlay, a type of plywood
Multidisciplinary design optimization, in engineering
Mixed-domain oscilloscope,  with FFT
Multi-domain operations by the US DoD